INS Sumitra is the fourth and last Saryu class patrol vessel of the Indian Navy, designed and constructed by Goa Shipyard Limited. It is also the presidential yacht of India. It is designed to undertake fleet support operations, coastal and offshore patrolling, ocean surveillance and monitoring of sea lines of communications and offshore assets and escort duties.

Construction
The keel of INS Sumitra was laid at Goa Shipyard Ltd (GSL) on 28 April 2010, and she was launched on 6 December 2010. During her construction at GSL, she was known as Yard 1211.

Service history
INS Sumitra completed her sea trials and was handed over to the Indian Navy on 18 July 2014, and was commissioned into the fleet by the Chief of Naval Staff Admiral RK Dhowan on 4 September 2014 in Chennai. She will operate under the Eastern Naval Command and conduct maritime surveillance and coastal security missions. Her first Commanding Officer is Commander Milind Mokashi.

Operation Raahat
On 30 March 2015, INS Sumitra and her crew rescued 350 Indian citizens stranded in Yemen, by evacuating them from the Yemeni port of Aden to Djibouti across the Red Sea. This rescue was part of Operation Raahat. Sumitra was diverted from her anti-piracy patrol in the Lakshadweep region to join the operation while Saudi Arabia-led forces were conducting air strikes against Houthi rebels.

Two other navy ships  and INS Tarkash (F50) were also part of this operation, along with two C-17 Globemaster transport aircraft of the Indian Air Force, two Airbus A-320 aircraft from Air India and passenger liners MV Kavaratti and MS Coral. The operations were overseen by Gen VK Singh (Retd), Minister of State for External Affairs, Government of India.

Gallery

See also
Sukanya-class patrol vessel
List of active Indian Navy ships

References

External links

 http://economictimes.indiatimes.com/news/politics-and-nation/navy-to-commission-ins-sumitra-on-september-4/articleshow/41515712.cms

2010 ships
Ships built in India
Patrol vessels of the Indian Navy
Royal and presidential yachts